Erica eugenia is a species of jumping spiders. It is the only species in the monotypic genus Erica. It was first described by George and Elizabeth Peckham in 1892, and is only found in Brazil and Panama.

References

Salticidae
Spiders described in 1892
Spiders of Central America
Spiders of South America